Min Chunfeng (born 17 March 1969) is a retired female discus thrower from the People's Republic of China.

International competitions

See also
China at the World Championships in Athletics

References

External links 
 
 

1969 births
Living people
Chinese female discus throwers
Olympic female discus throwers
Olympic athletes of China
Athletes (track and field) at the 1992 Summer Olympics
Asian Games gold medalists for China
Asian Games medalists in athletics (track and field)
Athletes (track and field) at the 1994 Asian Games
Medalists at the 1994 Asian Games
World Athletics Championships athletes for China
World Athletics Championships medalists
Japan Championships in Athletics winners
20th-century Chinese women